The Fujian Motors Group is based in the Fujian Province, China and was founded in 1992.

Group companies include Fujian Benz (50% joint venture with Daimler AG), Soueast Motors (50%), King Long (a bus manufacturer) (15%) and Higer Bus.

Brands

Fujian Benz

Fujian Benz Automotive Co., Ltd., formerly Fujian Daimler Automotive Co., Ltd., is a light commercial vehicle manufacturing company based in Fúzhōu, and a joint venture between the German Daimler AG, the Chinese state-owned Fujian Motors Group and the Taiwanese China Motor Corporation. Series production of Fujian Daimler's first product range, the Viano transporter, began in April 2010.

Soueast Motors

South East (Fujian) Motor Co., Ltd., trading as Soueast, is a Chinese automobile manufacturer based in Fuzhou, Fujian, and a joint venture between China Motor Corporation (25%), Fujian Motor Industry Group (50%) and Mitsubishi Motors (25%). Its principal activity is the design, development, production and sale of passenger cars and minibuses sold under the Soueast marque. It also manufactures Mitsubishi brand passenger cars for sale in mainland China.

King Long

King Long United Automotive Industry Co., Ltd or commonly known as King Long (literally, Golden Dragon) is a Chinese bus manufacturer headquartered in Xiamen, Fujian. Founded in December 1988, it is focused mainly on developing, manufacturing and selling large-and-medium-sized coaches and light vans. In 2008, King Long had an 18 percent share of the export market in China. Overseas sales contributed 25 percent of King Long's sales.

Higer

Higer Bus Company Limited, also known as Higer Bus, is a Chinese bus manufacturer based in Suzhou, Jiangsu province. It was established at the end of 1998. HIGER is China's leading exporter of buses and coaches.

Yudo Auto

Founded in December the 4th, 2015 in Putian, Fujian, Yudo Auto is a new energy vehicle brand with main shareholders are state-owned companies and the local government of Putian, in Fujian Province. Current products are listed below.

Yudo π1, electric subcompact crossover inspired by the Haval H1
Yudo π3, electric subcompact crossover
Yudo V01L, electric microvan

Keyton

Keyton also known as Fujian New Longma (NLM) or Fujian Qiteng (FQT) is a brand for MPVs, minivans and vans. It is sold overseas in several developing countries, including Egypt, Philippines, Bolivia, and Chile.

In May 2016, the company NEVS announced that they will take over the Chinese company New Longma (NLM) after acquiring 50% of the New Longma manufacturing plant. On May 12 2016, the formal contract was signed in Fujian. On 18 August 2016, NEVS officially took over Chinese vehicle company New Longma (NLM) in the Fujian province. At the same time, NLM signed the first contract with Panda New Energy on delivering 35,000 electric logistics delivery vans.

 Keyton V60
 Keyton EX80
 Keyton M70

References

External links
Fujian Motors website

Bus manufacturers of China
Electric vehicle manufacturers of China
Vehicle manufacturing companies established in 1992
Chinese companies established in 1992
Companies based in Fujian
Car manufacturers of China